Toyama Maru (富山丸) was a 7,089-ton Japanese troop transport during World War II. On 29 June 1944, Toyama Maru was transporting over 6,000 men of the Japanese 44th Independent Mixed Brigade when she was torpedoed and sunk by the submarine  in the Nansei Shoto, off Taira Jima, Japan, at position 27º47'N, 129º05'E. 5,400 soldiers and crew members were killed during the sinking, although 600 others got off the ship, making the sinking of Toyama Maru one of the worst maritime disasters in history.

See also 
 List by death toll of ships sunk by submarines
 List of battles and other violent events by death toll

References

External links 
 

World War II merchant ships of Japan
Ships sunk by American submarines
Battle of Okinawa
Maritime incidents in June 1944
1915 ships